Avar ("language of the mountains" or ,  , "Avar language"), also known as Avaric, is a Northeast Caucasian language of the Avar–Andic subgroup that is spoken by Avars, primarily in Dagestan. In 2010, there were approximately 1 million speakers in Dagestan and elsewhere in Russia.

Geographic distribution
It is spoken mainly in the western and southern parts of the Russian Caucasus republic of Dagestan, and the Balaken, Zaqatala regions of north-western Azerbaijan. Some Avars live in other regions of Russia. There are also small communities of speakers living in the Russian republics of Chechnya and Kalmykia; in Georgia, Kazakhstan, Ukraine, Jordan, and the Marmara Sea region of Turkey. It is spoken by about 800,000 people worldwide. UNESCO classifies Avar as vulnerable to extinction.

Status
It is one of six literary languages of Dagestan, where it is spoken not only by the Avar, but also serves as the language of communication between different ethnic groups.

Dialects
There are two main dialect groups: the northern, which includes Khunzakh, Kazbek, Gunib, Gumbet and others; and the southern, which includes Andalal, Gidatl', Antsukh, Charoda, Tlyarata, Tsumada, Tsunta and others.

Morphology
Avar is an agglutinative language, of SOV order.

Adverbs of place also distinguish locative, allative, and ablative forms suffixally, such as  "inside",  "to the inside", and  "from the inside".   is an emphatic suffix taken by underived adjectives.

Phonology

There are competing analyses of the distinction transcribed in the table with the length sign . Length is part of the distinction, but so is articulatory strength, so they have been analyzed as fortis and lenis. The fortis affricates are long in the fricative part of the contour, e.g.  (tss), not in the stop part as in geminate affricates in languages such as Japanese and Italian  (tts). Laver (1994) analyzes e.g.  as a two-segment affricate–fricative sequence [] .

Avar has five vowels, /a, e, i, o, u/.

Accent
In the Avar, the accent is free and mobile, independent of the number of syllables in the word. It also changes the semantic meaning and grammatical meaning of the word:
 ра́гӏи ‛word’ ~ рагӏи́ ‛fodder’
  ру́гънал ~  ругъна́л ‛wound’

Writing system
There were some attempts to write the Avar language in the Georgian alphabet as early as the 14th century. The use of Arabic script for representing Avar in marginal glosses began in the 15th century. The use of Arabic, which is known as ajam, is still known today.

As part of Soviet language re-education policies in 1928 the Ajam was replaced by a Latin alphabet, which in 1938 was in turn replaced by the current Cyrillic script. Essentially, it is the Russian alphabet plus one additional letter called palochka (stick, Ӏ). As that letter cannot be typed with common keyboard layouts, it is often replaced with a capital Latin letter i ( I ), small Latin letter L ( l ), or the numerical digit 1.

Orthography
The Avar language is usually written in the Cyrillic script. The letters of the alphabet are (with their pronunciation given below in IPA transcription):

History
The literary language is based on the болмацӏ (bolmacʼ)—bo = "army" or "country", and macʼ = "language"—the common language used between speakers of different dialects and languages. The bolmacʼ in turn was mainly derived from the dialect of Khunzakh, the capital and cultural centre of the Avar region, with some influence from the southern dialects. Nowadays the literary language is influencing the dialects, levelling out their differences.

The most famous figure of modern Avar literature is Rasul Gamzatov (died November 3, 2003), the People's Poet of Dagestan. Translations of his works into Russian have gained him a wide audience all over the former Soviet Union.

Samples

See also

 Northeast Caucasian languages
 Languages of the Caucasus

References

External links

 RFE/RL North Caucasus Radio (also includes Chechen and Adyghe)
 Avar language corpus (in English, Russian, Polish and Belarusian)
 Avar Cyrillic-Latin text and website converter
 Online Avar–Russian dictionary
 Avar language information in Russian

 
Agglutinative languages
Subject–object–verb languages
Languages written in Cyrillic script